Spyrou Kyprianou Avenue, is an important avenue located in the centre of Nicosia, Cyprus formerly known as Santa Rosa Avenue .

The Avenue was named after Spyros Kyprianou, a former president of the Republic of Cyprus.
It intersects Makariou Anevue and it hosts a number of highrises, Banks and financial and corporate services companies.

The Headquarters of the Electricity Authority of Cyprus, lie on the left-hand side of the Avenue and behind Stasikratous Street. 
  
Due to the numerous cafeterias, bars, clubs and restaurants located on the avenue it is effectively one of the key nightlife districts in the Cypriot capital.

Photogallery

Streets in Nicosia